Foremast Peak is a  mountain summit in British Columbia, Canada.

Description

Foremast Peak is located on Schooner Ridge in the Battle Range of the Selkirk Mountains. Precipitation runoff from the mountain drains north into Butters Creek and south into Houston Creek which are both tributaries of the Duncan River. Foremast Peak is more notable for its steep rise above local terrain than for its absolute elevation.

Etymology

The landform was named by Andrew J. Kauffman II who imagined the peaks on Schooner Ridge as resembling sails on a four-masted ship. The name was submitted in August 1972 by William Lowell Putnam III of the Harvard Mountaineering Club and follows the nautical naming theme for individual peaks on Schooner Ridge. The mountain's toponym was officially adopted on October 3, 1973, by the Geographical Names Board of Canada.

Climate

Based on the Köppen climate classification, Foremast Peak is located in a subarctic climate zone with cold, snowy winters, and mild summers. Winter temperatures can drop below −20 °C with wind chill factors below −30 °C.

See also
Geography of British Columbia

Omoo Peak

References

External links
 Foremast Peak: Weather forecast

Two-thousanders of British Columbia
Selkirk Mountains
Kootenay Land District